Jolliffe is a surname, and may refer to:

 Anne Jolliffe (1933–2021), Australian animator
 Arthur Jolliffe (1871–1944), British mathematician
 Charles Jolliffe (born 1972), Puerto Rican born actor and writer, "Crossing Styx" playwright
 Edmund Jolliffe (living), British composer
 Eric Jolliffe (1907–2001), Australian cartoonist and illustrator on outback themes
 Frances Jolliffe (1873–1925), American drama critic and suffragist
 Gray Jolliffe Graham Jolliffe (born 1937), British cartoonist and illustrator, "Wicked Willie"
 Hedworth Jolliffe, 2nd Baron Hylton (1829–1899), British peer and Conservative politician
 Henry Jolliffe John Henry Jolliffe (1865–1936), English first-class cricketer
 Hylton Jolliffe (1773–1843), MP for Petersfield 
 Hylton Jolliffe, 3rd Baron Hylton (1862–1945), British peer and Conservative politician
 Jill Jolliffe (1945–2022), Australian journalist and author who has reported on East Timor
 John Jolliffe (disambiguation) includes:
John Jolliffe (merchant) (1613–1680), Member of Parliament for Heytesbury, Governor of the Levant and Muscovy Companies
John Jolliffe (of Petersfield) (c.1697–1771), lawyer and Member of Parliament for Petersfield
John Jolliffe (surgeon), ship's surgeon on HMS Pandora, for whom Mount Jolliffe, near Drury Inlet was named
John Jolliffe (librarian) (1929–1985), Bodley's Librarian from 1982 to 1985
Hon. John Hedworth Jolliffe (born 1935), British writer, son of William Jolliffe, 4th Baron Hylton
Katrina A. Jolliffe, Australian organic chemist
Raymond Jolliffe, 5th Baron Hylton (born 1932), British peer and landowner
 Steve Jolliffe (born 1949), English rock musician.
 Ted Jolliffe Edward Bigelow Jolliffe QC (1909–1998), Canadian social democratic politician and lawyer from Ontario
 William Jolliffe, 1st Baron Hylton (1800–1876), British soldier and Conservative politician
 William Jolliffe, 4th Baron Hylton (1898–1967), British peer and soldier
 William Jolliffe (censor) (1851–1927), New Zealand's first Chief Censor of Films
 William Jolliffe (1745–1802), British politician who sat in the House of Commons from 1768 to 1802